Temple Beth Israel is a Reform synagogue located at 801 West Michigan Avenue in Jackson, Michigan. Formed in 1862 by Jews of German background, it grew out of the Hebrew Benevolent Society, which had been organized in 1858, and was the second Reform congregation in Michigan.

Dr. Jonathan V. Plaut, the son of the late rabbi Dr. W. Gunther Plaut, joined as rabbi in 2000 and served the congregation until his death in 2012.

In September 2011 Rabbi S. Robert Morais became Beth Israel's rabbi.

Notes

19th-century synagogues
German-Jewish culture in the United States
Jackson, Michigan
Reform synagogues in Michigan
Religious organizations established in 1862
Buildings and structures in Jackson County, Michigan
1862 establishments in Michigan